Bojongsari is a district in Purbalingga Regency, Central Java, Indonesia. This district is about 10 km away from Purbalingga, the capital city of Purbalingga Regency. The northern part of this district is the slopes of Mount Slamet.

History 
Bojongsari District was established in the early 90s, the area of ​​​​Bojongsari District was the Kutasari District's area at that time. Then, half of Kutasari district area was separated into Bojongsari District.

Geography 
Bojongsari district is bordered by Mrebet District and Karangreja District to the north, Kaligondang District and Mrebet District to the east, Purbalingga District to the south, Kutasari District and Padamara District to the west.

Subdivisions 
Bojongsari district has 13 villages
 Banjaran
 Beji
 Bojongsari (the capital of Bojongsari district)
 Brobot
 Bumisari
 Galuh
 Gembong
 Kajongan
 Karangbanjar
 Metenggeng
 Pagedangan
 Patemon
 Pekalongan

Tourist attractions 
 Owabong, located in Bojongsari village. Owabong is a water park and also a mini zoo, Owabong also has facilities such as a 4d cinema, games such as flying fox, zipline, wave pool, etc.

See also 
 List of districts of Central Java

References

External links 

Districts of Central Java